Deoxyadenosine (symbol dA or dAdo) is a deoxyribonucleoside. It is a derivative of the nucleoside adenosine, differing from the latter by the replacement of a hydroxyl group (-OH) by hydrogen (-H) at the 2′ position of its ribose sugar moiety. Deoxyadenosine is the DNA nucleoside A, which pairs with deoxythymidine (T) in double-stranded DNA. 

In absence of adenosine deaminase (ADA) it accumulates in T lymphocytes and kills these cells resulting in a genetic disorder known as adenosine deaminase severe combined immunodeficiency disease (ADA-SCID).

See also
Deoxyribonucleotide
Cordycepin (3′-deoxyadenosine)
Severe combined immunodeficiency

References

Nucleosides
Purines
Hydroxymethyl compounds